The 1970–71 Weber State Wildcats men's basketball team represented Weber State College during the 1970–71 NCAA University Division basketball season. Members of the Big Sky Conference, the Wildcats were led by third-year head coach Phil Johnson and played their home games on campus at Wildcat Gym in Ogden, Utah.

The conference tournament was five years away, and for the fourth consecutive season, Weber State won the Big Sky title and played in the 25-team NCAA tournament.  In the West regional at nearby Logan, they met Jerry Tarkanian's Long Beach State 49ers in the first round for a second straight year and lost again, this time by eleven points.

Both starting forwards were unanimously selected to the all-conference team; senior Willie Sojourner was named for a third consecutive season and junior Bob Davis repeated the next year.

Following the season, Johnson became an assistant in the NBA with the Chicago Bulls under Dick Motta, whom he had played for in high school in Idaho and coached under at Weber.

Postseason result

|-
!colspan=9 style=| NCAA tournament

References

External links
Sports Reference – Weber State Wildcats: 1970–71 basketball season
2015–16 Media Guide: 1970–71 season

Weber State Wildcats men's basketball seasons
Weber State
Weber State